Ania Hertel (also spelt as Anna Hertel; born 27 October 2000) is a Polish tennis player.

Hertel has a career-high WTA ranking of 694 in singles, achieved on 12 August 2019. She also has a career-high WTA ranking of 285 in doubles, achieved on 2 August 2021.

Hertel made her WTA Tour main-draw debut at the 2021 WTA Poland Open in the doubles competition.

She plays college tennis at the University of Georgia.

ITF Circuit finals

Singles: 2 (2 runner–up)

Doubles: 8 (4 titles, 4 runner–ups)

References

External links
 
 
 

2000 births
Living people
Polish female tennis players
Sportspeople from Warsaw
Georgia Lady Bulldogs tennis players
21st-century Polish women